Walter Haselshaw was a medieval English Bishop of Bath and Wells. He was elected 7 August 1302 and consecrated 4 November 1302. He died 11 December 1308.

Citations

References

 

Bishops of Bath and Wells
1308 deaths
Deans of Wells
Year of birth unknown
14th-century English Roman Catholic bishops